Bernice Papasina Mene  (born 18 January 1975) is a former New Zealand netball player.

Mene represented New Zealand playing netball for the Silver Ferns for 10 years, playing 78 tests. She captained the domestic team the Southern Sting from 1998 to 2003, with the team winning the National Bank Cup each year she captained except for 1998. Mene is a qualified teacher. She made a guest appearance on episode 3.5 of the New Zealand cartoon Bro'Town. Mene has been a Sky TV commentator for Sky Sport 1's live netball coverage of the ANZ Championship along with former Silver Ferns (Tania Dalton, Anna Stanley) and Australian netball players (Natalie Avellino and Kathryn Harby-Williams).

In the 2003 New Year Honours, Mene was appointed a Member of the New Zealand Order of Merit, for services to netball.

She is married to former New Zealand cricketer Dion Nash. Together they have three children.

Mene is the daughter of former decathlete Mene Mene and former javelin and discus thrower Sally Mene (née Flynn).

References

1975 births
Living people
New Zealand netball players
New Zealand sportspeople of Samoan descent
Members of the New Zealand Order of Merit
Commonwealth Games silver medallists for New Zealand
Commonwealth Games medallists in netball
Netball players at the 1998 Commonwealth Games
Netball players at the 1993 World Games
New Zealand netball commentators
1995 World Netball Championships players
1999 World Netball Championships players
Southern Sting players
Medallists at the 1998 Commonwealth Games